Leigh Andrew-Pearson (born 3 July 1972) is a Canadian sailor. She competed in the women's 470 event at the 1996 Summer Olympics.

References

External links
 

1972 births
Living people
Canadian female sailors (sport)
Olympic sailors of Canada
Sailors at the 1996 Summer Olympics – 470
Sportspeople from Ottawa